Etielloides bipartitellus is a species of snout moth in the genus Etielloides. It was described by John Henry Leech in 1889, and is known from China, Japan and Korea.

References

Moths described in 1889
Phycitinae